This is a list of the queens consorts of Hungary, the consorts of the kings of Hungary. After the extinction of the Árpád dynasty and later the Angevin dynasty, the title of King of Hungary has been held by a monarch outside of Hungary with a few exceptions. After 1526, the title of Queen of Hungary belonged to the wife of the Habsburg Emperors who were also King of Hungary.

Queens of Hungary also held the titles after 1526: Holy Roman Empress (later Empress of Austria) and Queen consort of Bohemia. Since Leopold I, all kings of Hungary used the title of Apostolic King of Hungary the title given to Saint Stephen I by the Pope and their wives were styled as Apostolic Queens of Hungary.

The title lasted just a little over nine centuries, from 1000 to 1918.

The Kingdom of Hungary also had two queens regnant (királynő) who were crowned as kings: Maria I and Maria II Theresa.

Grand Princesses of the Hungarians

Queens consort of Hungary

House of Árpád, 1000–1038

House of Orseolo, 1038/44–1041/46

House of Aba, 1041–1044

House of Árpád, 1046–1301

House of Přemyslid, 1301–1305

House of Wittelsbach, 1305–1308 
Wenceslaus's successor Otto's first wife, Katharine of Habsburg, died 23 years before her husband became King of Hungary; and he married his second wife, Agnes of Glogau, two years after he lost the throne to Charles I.

Capetian House of Anjou, 1308–1395 
Charles Martel of Anjou pressed his claim to the throne of Hungary and became titular King of Hungary in 1290; his wife, Klementia of Habsburg became titular queen consort of Hungary, but Charles Martel failed to govern Hungary and died in 1295. Charles Martel and Klementia were never the proper King and Queen. Charles Martel also died in his parents' lifetime.

House of Luxembourg, 1395–1437

House of Habsburg, 1437–1439

House of Jagiellon, 1440–1444 

Ulászló I had no children and did not get married (contemporary opinions, quoted by Jan Długosz, suggested that he was homosexual). He was succeeded in Poland by his younger brother Casimir IV Jagiellon in 1447 after a three-year interregnum. In Hungary, he was succeeded by his former rival, the child Ladislaus the Posthumous.

House of Habsburg, 1440/44–1457 
Ladislaus the Posthumous died suddenly in Prague on 23 November 1457 while preparing for his marriage to Magdalena of Valois, daughter of Charles VII of France. He and Magdalena, therefore, never married.

House of Hunyadi, 1458–1490

House of Jagiellon, 1490–1526

House of Szapolyai, 1526–1570 
In dispute with the Habsburgs.

House of Habsburg, 1526–1780

House of Habsburg-Lorraine, 1780–1918

Titular queens consort of Hungary

House of Habsburg-Lorraine (since 1918)

References

See also 

 List of Austrian consorts
 List of Bohemian consorts
 List of Transylvanian consorts

Queens regnant of Hungary
 
Consorts
Hungarian
Hungarian